The Women's 4×100 Freestyle Relay at the 10th FINA World Swimming Championships (25m) was swum on 18 December 2010 in Dubai, United Arab Emirates. 17 nations had teams swims the preliminary heats, from which the top-8 advanced to the evenings final to swim again.

Records
At the start of the event, the existing World (WR) and Championship records (CR) were as follows.

The following records were established during the competition:

Results

Heats

Final

References

Freestyle relay 4x100 metre, Women's
World Short Course Swimming Championships
2010 in women's swimming